Wu Yuhong (born 3 November 1966) is a former Chinese badminton player. Yuhong was the runner-up in 1993 Birmingham World Championships and has won medals in several other prominent competitions such as World Cup, Uber Cup, Asian Cup, Asian Championships, Asian Games and East Asian Games.

Career 
Wu Yuhong, whose ancestral home is in Hualien county, Taiwan, is a member of the Ami tribe of Taiwan’s aboriginal tribe and a member of the Taiwan League. In the 14th Uber Cup held in 1992, she won the gold medal, beating South Korea in the final. She won 1992 Asian Badminton Championships, 1993 East Asian Games team event, China Open, Hong Kong Open, National championships twice, and most importantly World Badminton Championships women’s doubles runner-up in 1993. She also won a silver in the 1994 Uber Cup after losing to Indonesian team. She has won nearly 100 championships, runner-up medals and trophies. After retiring from the national team, she was invited to Thailand to serve as the coach of the country's badminton women's team. She currently works at the Ping-Badminton Center of the Fujian Provincial Sports Industry Brigade, in charge of administrative work related to the event, and she is still a badminton coach in her spare time.

Family 
Wu Yuhong was born in a sports family. Her father, Wu Yuanjin, came to People's republic of China from Taiwan in his early years. In the 1950s, he won consecutive hurdles and long jump championships in the All-Army Games, and later served as the captain of the Bayi Track and Field Team. He is also a well-known social activist and former Taiwan Federation of Fujian Province. Wu Yuhong's mother, Chen Shaoying, was the champion of the first National Games Women's Cycling Race and her brother Wu Yuqi was a member of the Bayi Parachuting Team.

Achievements

World Championships 
Women's doubles

World Cup 
Women's doubles

Asian Championships 
Women's doubles

Mixed doubles

Asian Cup 
Women's doubles

IBF World Grand Prix 
The World Badminton Grand Prix sanctioned by International Badminton Federation (IBF) from 1983 to 2006.

Women's doubles

Mixed doubles

IBF International 
Women's singles

Women's doubles

References 

1966 births
Living people
Chinese female badminton players
Badminton players at the 1994 Asian Games
Asian Games bronze medalists for China
Asian Games medalists in badminton
Medalists at the 1994 Asian Games